For Self-Examination (subtitle: Recommended to the Present Age) is a work by Danish philosopher Søren Kierkegaard.  It was published on September 20, 1851, as part of Kierkegaard's second authorship.  The work has been called one of Kierkegaard's most accessible works, where he writes with "the metaphorical imagination of a poet, the thoughtfulness of a philosopher and theologian, the whimsy of the humourist, and the ardour of the lover and believer."

Notes

References
 Hong, Howard V. & Edna H. The Essential Kierkegaard.  Princeton University Press, 2000.

External links
 Kierkegaard, D. Anthony Storm's Commentary on – For Self-Examination

1851 books
Books by Søren Kierkegaard
Philosophical novels